In Greek mythology, Asteria (Ancient Greek: Ἀστερία, "of the stars, starry one") was a name attributed to several distinct individuals.

Individuals 
 Asteria, a minor goddess, daughter of Phoebe and Coeus.
 Asteria or Astris, daughter of Helios and Clymene or Ceto, one of the Heliades. She married the river god Hydaspes (the modern Jhelum River) and became mother of Deriades, king in India.
 Asteria, one of the Danaïdes, daughters of Danaus who, with one exception, murdered their husbands on their wedding nights. She was, briefly, the bride of Chaetus.
 Asteria, one of the Alcyonides, daughters of the giant Alcyoneus. She was the sister of Alkippe, Anthe, Drimo, Pallene, Methone and Phthonia (Phosthonia or Chthonia). When their father Alcyoneus was slain by Heracles, these girls threw themselves into the sea from Kanastraion, which is the peak of Pellene. They were then transformed into halcyons (kingfishers) by the goddess Amphitrite.
 Asteria, daughter of Hydeus, was the mother of Hydissos by Bellerophon. Her son is known for having founded a city in Caria which was named after him.
 Asteria, daughter of Coronus, and Apollo were possible parents of the seer Idmon.
 Asteria or Asterodia, mother of Crisus and Panopeus by Phocus.
 Asteria, daughter of Teucer and Eune of Cyprus.
 Asteria, the ninth Amazon killed by Heracles when he came for Hippolyte's girdle.
 Asteria, an Athenian maiden among the would-be sacrificial victims of Minotaur, portrayed in a vase painting.

In popular culture
 Christoph Willibald Gluck gave the name Asteria to a character in his 1765 opera Telemaco, though the name did not appear in Homer's Odyssey, on which the opera is based.
 Multiple characters named Asteria appear in the DC Universe and the DC Extended Universe:
 Asteria first appeared in the 1998 one-shot issue Elseworld's Finest: Supergirl & Batgirl; "her origin or background isn't touched upon, but she does seem to be Amazon stock".
 Another version of Asteria appeared in the 2018 issues Justice League/Aquaman: Drowned Earth Special #1 and Justice League #11. In the first issue, Asteria is a two-headed metallic bird. In the second issue, Wonder Woman informs Aquaman that "the name 'Asteria' belonged to an ancient Amazonian who fought against the gods. Her name means, of the sky".
 In the 2020 film Wonder Woman 1984, Asteria is portrayed by Lynda Carter. The character is depicted as the greatest Amazon warrior. When mankind enslaved the Amazonian women, Asteria fought for their freedom, allowing Queen Hippolyta to free them and their race to escape to the island known as Themyscira. The island created by Zeus allowed the Amazons to remain hidden from mankind, while Asteria was venerated by the Amazons as a fallen hero. During the post-credits sequence, she is seen walking amongst a crowded street and saves a pedestrian from being hit by a falling object.
 Asteria is the codename of the Chapter 4 map in Fortnite Battle Royale. This continues the trend of each map being named after a Greek deity whose name starts with the letter "A" (Athena for Chapter 1, Apollo for Chapter 2, and Artemis for Chapter 3).

See also

 Greek mythology
 Goddess
 List of goddesses

Notes

References 

 Apollodorus, The Library with an English Translation by Sir James George Frazer, F.B.A., F.R.S. in 2 Volumes, Cambridge, MA, Harvard University Press; London, William Heinemann Ltd. 1921. ISBN 0-674-99135-4. Online version at the Perseus Digital Library. Greek text available from the same website.
Diodorus Siculus, The Library of History translated by Charles Henry Oldfather. Twelve volumes. Loeb Classical Library. Cambridge, Massachusetts: Harvard University Press; London: William Heinemann, Ltd. 1989. Vol. 3. Books 4.59–8. Online version at Bill Thayer's Web Site
 Diodorus Siculus, Bibliotheca Historica. Vol 1-2. Immanel Bekker. Ludwig Dindorf. Friedrich Vogel. in aedibus B. G. Teubneri. Leipzig. 1888–1890. Greek text available at the Perseus Digital Library.
 Hesiod, Theogony from The Homeric Hymns and Homerica with an English Translation by Hugh G. Evelyn-White, Cambridge, MA.,Harvard University Press; London, William Heinemann Ltd. 1914. Online version at the Perseus Digital Library. Greek text available from the same website.
 Stephanus of Byzantium, Stephani Byzantii Ethnicorum quae supersunt, edited by August Meineike (1790-1870), published 1849. A few entries from this important ancient handbook of place names have been translated by Brady Kiesling. Online version at the Topos Text Project.
Suida, Suda Encyclopedia translated by Ross Scaife, David Whitehead, William Hutton, Catharine Roth, Jennifer Benedict, Gregory Hays, Malcolm Heath Sean M. Redmond, Nicholas Fincher, Patrick Rourke, Elizabeth Vandiver, Raphael Finkel, Frederick Williams, Carl Widstrand, Robert Dyer, Joseph L. Rife, Oliver Phillips and many others. Online version at the Topos Text Project.

Danaids
Amazons (Greek mythology)
Mythological Thracian women
Metamorphoses into birds in Greek mythology
Thessalian characters in Greek mythology
Mythology of Phocis
Greek mythology of Thrace